dos y dos is an experimental indie album, the fourth by the band dos and the first release in fifteen years by the band. It is a double bass guitar side project for Mike Watt (of the Minutemen and Firehose) and Kira Roessler (from Black Flag). The two were married from 1987–1994.

Watt wanted dos y dos to have less vocals than the previous album, Justamente tres.

Reception
Metro Times called the album "fascinating, experimental and enjoyable" with "an almost spiritual, world music feel to the songs." Folk and Acoustic Music Exchange said "Dos Y Dos has a charming storybook character to it, seemingly accompaniment for a Roald Dahl film that was never made." L.A. Record praised the album and likened it to listening to a "quiet, melodic, throbbing conversation." Spectrum Culture praised the musicianship but said the album was "great for having a think, but it ultimately lacks any major distinction." SLUG magazine appreciated the album saying it was "a whole lot of history filtered through rather sparse instrumentation."

Track listing
Number Nine
The Winds of May
Maker Her Me
New Years Waltz
Uncle Mike
Ties to Bind
Number Eight
Only You will Know
No Me Querda Mas (originally recorded by Selena)
Frantic
Song for Poe
It Turned Cold
Om Om Om

References

External links
Clenchedwrench records
dos y dos at Mike Watt's Hoot Page

Mike Watt albums
2011 albums